Spathognathodontidae is an extinct conodont family ranging from the Silurian to the Devonian.

Genera
Genera are:
 †Flajsella
 †Lanea
 †Ozarkodina
 †Spathognathodus
 †Tortodus
 †Wurmiella 
 †Zieglerodina

References 

 A new Ludlow (Late Silurian) Spathognathodontidae (Conodonta) from Bohemia with incipient alternating denticulation. P. Carls, L. Slavík and José Ignacio Valenzuela-Ríos, Neues Jahrbuch für Geologie und Paläontologie - Monatshefte, September 2005, 9, pages 547–565.

External links 
 

 
 Spathognathodontidae at fossilworks.org (retrieved 30 April 2016)

Ozarkodinida families
Silurian first appearances
Devonian extinctions